Dudnath Ramkissoon (born 13 October 1951) is a Trinidadian cricketer. He played in 32 first-class and 6 List A matches for Trinidad and Tobago from 1969 to 1979. He was also the first captain of the West Indies under-19 cricket team.

See also
 List of Trinidadian representative cricketers

References

External links
 

1951 births
Living people
Trinidad and Tobago cricketers